Gabriel Jackson may refer to:
 Gabriel Jackson (composer) (born 1962), English composer and arranger
 Gabriel Jackson (Hispanist) (1921–2019), American hispanist and historian